Hashem B. El-Serag is a Palestinian-American physician and medical researcher best known for his research in liver cancer, hepatocellular carcinoma (HCC) and the hepatitis C virus. He serves as the Margaret M. and Albert B. Alkek Chairman of the Department of Medicine at Baylor College of Medicine as well as the Director of the Texas Medical Center Digestive Disease Center. El-Serag previously served as president of the American Gastroenterological Association and Editor-in-Chief of Clinical Gastroenterology and Hepatology.

Early life and education
El-Serag was born in 1966 in Libya to Palestinian parents from the Gaza Strip. He received his M.D. with Honors from Al-Arab Medical University in Benghazi, Libya in 1991. He then moved to the United States, where he performed his residency in internal medicine at Yale University Greenwich Hospital (Connecticut) (1993-1995) and received a gastroenterology fellowship in clinical gastroenterology at the University of New Mexico in Albuquerque (1995-1997), before earning his Master of Public Health from the University of New Mexico in 1998.

Research and career
Most of the research on hepatocellular carcinoma in the United States can be attributed to El-Serag, who has published more than 300 scholarly papers on the subject. Dr. El-Serag also has become a leading expert on chronic liver disease and gastroesophageal reflux disease. His research also focuses on the clinical epidemiology and outcomes of several digestive disorders, including Barrett's esophagus, esophageal adenocarcinoma and hepatitis C. He has obtained more than 60 funded research grants, including those from the National Institutes of Health, the Cancer Prevention and Research Institute of Texas, the VA and professional societies. 

Dr. El-Serag joined the Michael E. DeBakey VA Medical Center and Baylor College of Medicine in Houston, Texas in 1999, where he later became Chief of the Baylor College of Medicine Section of Gastroenterology and Hepatology (2007-2016) in the Department of Medicine. He also served as Leader, Cancer Prevention and Population Sciences Program, at the Dan L Duncan Comprehensive Cancer Center, and as Chief of Clinical Epidemiology and Outcomes Division at Michael E. DeBakey VA Medical Center. In 2014, he became the Director of the Texas Medical Center Digestive Disease Center, funded by a P-30 NIH Grant and one of only six successful centers in the United States. In 2017, he was selected to serve as the Margaret M. and Albert B. Alkek Chairman of the Department of Medicine at Baylor College of Medicine, where he also serves as a professor, researcher and clinician. He also is an Adjunct Professor in the Department of Epidemiology at the School of Public Health, University of Texas Health Science Center. El-Serag has given more than 300 local, regional, national and international presentations.

Awards and memberships
Selected awards include:
2019 - “World's Most Influential Scientific Minds” in the area of Clinical Medicine by Thomson Reuters
2016 - Michael E. DeBakey Excellence in Research Award
2016 - NAAMA Local Chapter Prestigious Award
2016 - Ben Qurrah Award
2011 - Blue Faery Award for Excellence in Liver Cancer Research
2005 - American Gastroenterological Association's Masters Award in Clinical Research
2003 - American Gastroenterological Association's Young Clinical Investigator Award
1997 - GlaxoWellcome Digestive Health Foundation Award for Health Care Advancement

His leadership roles and honors have included President-Elect and president of the American Gastroenterological Association (2018-2019), the leading professional society for gastroenterologists. El-Serag has been selected into the American Society for Clinical Investigation (ASCI) and the American Association of Physicians (AAP). 

Additional selected memberships include:
St. Luke's Health System Board of Directors
Journal of Clinical Gastroenterology Editorial Board
Digestive and Liver Disease Editorial Board
American Gastroenterological Association Member
American Association for the Study of Liver Disease Member

Publications and media
El-Serag has more than 550 published papers to his credit, including in notable journals such as the New England Journal of Medicine, JAMA, Annals of Internal Medicine, Archives of Internal Medicine, Gastroenterology, Hepatology, and GUT.  The seminal work on HCC, published in the New England Journal of Medicine, Rising Incidence of Hepatocellular Carcinoma in the United States, has been cited approximately 3400 times. He has a H. index of 137. In addition, he was the Associate Editor of Gastroenterology, the leading specialty journal, and Editor-in-Chief of Clinical Gastroenterology and Hepatology (2012-2017). 

Dr. El-Serag is co-author of the book Contemporary Diagnosis and Management of Upper GI Disorders.

References

External links
 Selected publications by Dr. Hashem El-Serag at The National Center for Biotechnology Information
 Baylor College of Medicine, Section of Gastroenterology and Hepatology
 Center for Advanced Endoscopy
 Texas Medical Center Digestive Disease Center
 Baylor College of Medicine, Department of Medicine
 Biography of Hashem El-Serag at the United States Department of Veterans Affairs

Living people
American people of Palestinian descent
1966 births
American medical researchers
Palestinian scientists
Al-Arab Medical University alumni
Baylor College of Medicine faculty
Yale University alumni